Mall of the North (often shortened to MOTN), is a super regional shopping mall situated in Bendor Park, Polokwane in the Limpopo province of South Africa. It has a mix of shops, restaurants and a cinema complex.

On April 14, 2011, Mall of the North was personally officiated by the former Premier of Limpopo, Cassel Mathale alongside the executive mayor of Polokwane, Freddy Greaver.

Pick n Pay and Checkers are the anchor tenants, they occupy more than 5 000m2 of floor space, as well as Edgars, Woolworths and Game.

Statistics

Tenants 
Mall of the North is composed of 180 stores including Pick n Pay, Woolworth, Checkers, Game and Edgars. Nationally the mall include Truworths, two Foschini stores neighboring each other, Mr. Price, Dis-Chem and Clicks. Anchors are aided by a full range of fashion, footwear, sportswear, furnishings, home decor and healthcare stores. Includes exciting international brands H&M, Pringle of Scotland, Lacoste, Polo, Levi's and international retailers Cotton On and Factorie. Banks include African Bank, Standard Bank, ABSA, FNB, Old Mutual, Nedbank and Capitec Bank. Entertainment includes 6 Ster-Kinekor cines and The Fun Company.

Services

Service options 
 In-store shopping
 Lifts & escalators

Accessibility 
 Wheelchair accessible entrance
 Wheelchair accessible lift
 Motorized, non-motorized 
 Wheelchair rentals

Amenities 
 Free Wi-Fi 
 Public toilet

See also 
List of shopping malls in South Africa

References

External links 

Shopping malls established in 2011
Shopping centres in South Africa
Buildings and structures in Limpopo
Tourist attractions in Limpopo
Economy of Limpopo
Polokwane
21st-century architecture in South Africa